Koh-Lanta: Palawan was the seventh season of the French version of Survivor, Koh-Lanta. This season took place in Philippines in Palawan, and was broadcast on TF1 from June 29, 2007 to September 11, 2007 airing on Fridays at 6:55 p.m. The two original tribes this season were Batang and Guntao. Due to the voluntary exits of Ali and Andrien, both Grégoire and Pascale re-entered the competition after their initial eliminations. This season, like in Bocas del Toro, both finalists received three jury votes and were both given the titles of Survivor.

The winners of this season of Koh-lanta were Jade Handi and Kevin Cuoco who split the prize of €110,000 after tying in the final tribal council with a 3-3 jury vote.

Contestants

Future appearances
Filomène Fortes and Jade Handi returned for Koh-Lanta: Le Retour des Héros. Grégoire Delachaux returned for Koh-Lanta: Le Choc des Héros which Delachaux won. Handi returned for a third time in Koh-Lanta: La Légende.

Voting History

 As ambassadors for their tribes, before the merge Laurent and Patrick were asked to cast a joint vote for one of their fellow contestants. They chose to vote for Érick.

 As both Maryline and Patrick received two votes at the twelfth tribal council, the contestants were forced to vote again in order to determine which of the two would be eliminated.

References

External links

Koh-Lanta seasons
2007 French television seasons
Television shows filmed in the Philippines